The 1995 Historic Formula One Championship (also known as Thoroughbred Grand Prix) was the first season of the Historic Formula One Championship. It began at Donington Park on May 21 and ended at Brno on October 1.

It was won by Martin Stretton driving a Tyrrell 005 despite not winning any of the five races.

Calendar

References

Historic Formula One Championship
1995 in motorsport